Kathrin Bringmann (born 8 May 1977) is a German number theorist in the University of Cologne, Germany, who has made fundamental contributions to the theory of mock theta functions.

Education and career

Kathrin Bringmann was born on 8 May 1977, in Muenster, Germany. She passed the State Examinations in Mathematics and Theology at the University of Würzburg, Germany, in 2002, and obtained a Diploma in Mathematics at Würzburg in 2003.

During 2004–07, she was Edward Burr Van Vleck Assistant Professor with the University of Wisconsin where she began her collaboration with Ken Ono. After briefly serving as an assistant professor at the University of Minnesota, she joined the University of Cologne, Germany, as Professor.

Recognition
Bringmann has been awarded the Alfried Krupp-Förderpreis for Young Professors, a one-million-Euro prize instituted by the Alfried Krupp von Bohlen und Halbach Foundation. She is the third mathematician to win this prize. She has also been awarded the SASTRA Ramanujan Prize in 2009 for her contributions to "areas of mathematics influenced by the genius Srinivasa Ramanujan."

She was the Emmy Noether Lecturer of the German Mathematical Society in 2015.

A book by Bringmann with Amanda Folsom, Ken Ono, and Larry Rolen, Harmonic Maass Forms and Mock Modular Forms: Theory and Applications (Amer. Math. Soc., 2018), won the 2018 Prose Award for Best Scholarly Book in Mathematics from the Association of American Publishers.

References

External links

1977 births
Living people
20th-century German mathematicians
21st-century German mathematicians
Number theorists
Recipients of the SASTRA Ramanujan Prize
German women mathematicians
People from Münster
Heidelberg University alumni
University of Würzburg alumni
University of Wisconsin–Madison faculty
University of Minnesota faculty
Academic staff of the University of Cologne
20th-century women mathematicians
21st-century women mathematicians
20th-century German women
21st-century German women